Nicholas Cohen (born 1961) is a British journalist, author and political commentator. He was a columnist for The Observer and a blogger for The Spectator. Following accusations of sexual harassment, he left The Observer in 2022 and began publishing on the Substack platform.

Personal life
Cohen was born in Stockport, and raised in Manchester. His father was Jewish. He was educated at Altrincham Grammar School for Boys and Hertford College, Oxford, where he read Philosophy, Politics and Economics (PPE).

Cohen lives in Islington with his wife and their son. He is an atheist but says he is becoming "more Jewish". He is an honorary associate of the National Secular Society.

Career
Cohen began his career at the Sutton Coldfield News, before moving to the Birmingham Post, later becoming a contributor to The Independent and The Observer in 1996.

Cohen was a columnist for The Observer and a regular contributor to The Spectator. He has also written for Time, the Independent on Sunday, the London Review of Books, the London Evening Standard, the New Statesman and The New European. He has written for the magazine Private Eye under the pseudonym "Ratbiter".

In August 2022, Press Gazette reported that Cohen's regular Observer column had been "paused", pending an investigation by the newspaper's publisher, Guardian News and Media (GNM). The Gazette also reported that allegations against Cohen had been made public by the barrister Jolyon Maugham, and that a direct complaint had been made by the journalist Lucy Siegle, which she accused GNM of mishandling. Writing in The New European, Siegle detailed her alleged sexual harassment by Cohen in the Observer offices some years before, along with her experience of making a complaint in 2018 and her claim that GNM executives failed to offer a formal investigation.

Cohen's last column for The Observer was published in July 2022. In December 2022, he began publishing on Substack. In January 2023, the Press Gazette reported that he had resigned from The Observer on "health grounds".

Views

Foreign policy
In the early 2000s, Cohen was a critic of the government of Israel and described Zionism as "colonialism".

Cohen was for many years a critic of Tony Blair's foreign policy.  He began modifying his views after 2001, advocating hawkish neoconservative support for the 2003 invasion of Iraq, and becoming a critic of the Stop the War Coalition. In 2006, he was a leading signatory to the Euston Manifesto, which proposed what it termed "a new political alignment", in which the left would take a stronger, hawkish neoconservative stance in favour of military intervention and against what the signatories deemed to be anti-American attitudes. Cohen supported the NATO-led intervention in Libya to oust former Libyan leader Muammar Gaddafi in 2011. In 2012, he called for Western military intervention in the Syrian Civil War.

Domestic
In a 2006 press release, the Muslim Council of Britain suggested Cohen and four other journalists were "part of a circle of pernicious Islamophobic commentators".

In August 2014, Cohen was one of 200 public figures who were signatories to a letter to The Guardian opposing Scottish independence in the run-up to September's referendum on that issue.

In 2014, he spoke out against the UK Independence Party and its leader, Nigel Farage, in The Observer, for which he received the Commentator Award by the European Press Prize a year later.

Other
Cohen criticised Ecuador for granting political asylum to Julian Assange and called Ecuador a "petro-socialist authoritarian state". He has also been critical of the CANZUK agreement, calling it "an Anglo-Saxon Narnia". He has criticised halal and kosher slaughter and believes they should be illegal.

Works

He has written five books: Cruel Britannia: Reports on the Sinister and the Preposterous (1999), a collection of his journalism; Pretty Straight Guys (2003), a highly critical account of the New Labour project; What's Left? (2007), a critique of the contemporary liberal left, which was shortlisted for the Orwell Prize; Waiting for the Etonians: Reports from the Sickbed of Liberal England (2009); and You Can't Read this Book (2012), which deals with censorship.

Bibliography
Cohen, Nick (2000). Cruel Britannia: Reports on the Sinister and the Preposterous. Verso Books. 
Cohen, Nick (2003). Pretty Straight Guys. Faber and Faber: paperback edition. 
Cohen, Nick (2007). What's Left? How Liberals Lost Their Way. Fourth Estate. 
Cohen, Nick (2009). Waiting for the Etonians: Reports from the Sickbed of Liberal England. Fourth Estate. 
Cohen, Nick (2012). You Can't Read This Book: Censorship in an Age of Freedom. Fourth Estate.

References

External links
 

1961 births
Alumni of Hertford College, Oxford
British male journalists
Living people
Writers from Manchester
People from Stockport
British secularists
English atheists
English people of Jewish descent
British critics of Islam
The Observer people
The Spectator people
The Independent people
London Evening Standard people
European Press Prize winners
British republicans